Vayu (वायु), Wayu or Hayu (हायु) is a Sino-Tibetan language spoken in Nepal by about 1740 people in Bagmati Province. Dialects include Pali gau (पालि गाउ) Mudajor Sukajor Ramechhap  Sindhuli and Marin Khola.

The Vayu language features SOV ordering. There are strong Nepali influences in its phonology, lexicon, and grammar. Its writing system uses the Devanagari script. There are no known monolingual speakers of the language, as its speaking population also uses Nepali. Despite a lack of monolingual children, use of Vayu has survived into the 21st century

Phonology

Geographical distribution
Vayu is spoken in the following locations of Nepal.

Ramechhap District, Bagmati Province: Mudajor and Sukajor villages
Sindhuli District: Manedihi village

Vayu is spoken in the Sun Koshi valley, southwards across the Mahabharat range. Ethnic Vayu live on the hills on both sides of the Sun Kosi River but the language is only spoken in the villages listed.

References

Bibliography
 Boyd Michailovsky (1988) La langue hayu. Editions du Centre National de la Recherche Scientifique.
 Boyd Michailovsky (2003) "Hayu". In Graham Thurgood & Randy LaPolla (eds.), The Sino-Tibetan Languages, 518–532. London & New York: Routledge.
 George van Driem (2001) Languages of the Himalayas: An Ethnolinguistic Handbook of the Greater Himalayan Region. Brill.

Further reading
Hodgson, B. (1857). Váyu Vocabulary. Journal of the Asiatic Society of Bengal 26. 372-485.

Hodgson, B. (1858). On the Vayu tribe of the Central Himalaya. Journal of the Asiatic Society of Bengal 27. 443-6.

Michailovsky, B. (1973). Notes on the Hayu language. Kailash : A Journal of Himalayan Studies, 1(2), 135-152.
 
Michailovsky, B. (1974). Hayu Typology and Verbal Morphology. Linguistics Of The Tibeto-Burman Area, 11-26.

Michailovsky, B. (1976). A Case of Rhinoglottophilia in Hayu. Linguistics Of The Tibeto-Burman Area, 2293.

Park, I. (1995). Grammaticalization of Verbs in Three Tibeto-Burman Languages. Dissertation Abstracts International, 55(8), 2369A.

Sherard, M. (1986). Morphological Structure of the Pronominal and Verb Systems in Two Pronominalized Himalayan Languages. In J. McCoy, T. Light (Eds.), Contributions to Sino-Tibetan Studies (pp. 172–199). Leiden: Brill.

Yadava, Y. P., Glover, W. W. (1999). Topics in Nepalese Linguistics. In Yadava, Yogendra P. and Warren W. Glover (eds.) Kamaladi, Kathmandu: Royal Nepal Academy. p. 603.

External links
 Vayu recordings from COCOON, COllections de COrpus Oraux Numériques
 Endangered Languages Profile for Vayu

Articles in class projects/Rutgers
Kiranti languages
Languages of Nepal
Subject–object–verb languages
Endangered Sino-Tibetan languages
Languages of Bagmati Province